The Late Matthias Pascal may refer to:

 Il fu Mattia Pascal, a novel by Luigi Pirandello.
 Feu Mathias Pascal, a 1925 French film adaptation by Marcel L'Herbier.